Coleophora deauratella is a moth of the family Coleophoridae. It is found in most of Europe, Asia Minor, Tasmania, North America and New Zealand.

Description
The wingspan is 11–13 mm. Head metallic bronze. Antennae dark grey, apex white, towards base thickened with dense dark coppery-bronzy scales [Antenna thickened with projecting scales at base to beyond the first three segments]. Forewings shining brassy bronze, towards apex coppery-tinged. Hindwings dark grey.  Adults are on wing from June to July.

The larvae feed on red clover (Trifolium pratense). The larvae feed on the developing seeds and build a case closely resembling a floret of the food plant.

Distribution
It is found in most of Europe, as well as Asia Minor, Lebanon and Tasmania. It is an introduced species in North America and New Zealand.

References

External links

 Swedish Moths
 UKmoths
 Images
 Bug Guide

deauratella
Moths described in 1846
Moths of Asia
Moths of Australia
Moths of Europe
Moths of North America
Taxa named by Friederike Lienig
Taxa named by Philipp Christoph Zeller